The Overseas Highway is a  highway carrying U.S. Route 1 (US 1) through the Florida Keys to Key West. Large parts of it were built on the former right-of-way of the Overseas Railroad, the Key West Extension of the Florida East Coast Railway. Completed in 1912, the Overseas Railroad was heavily damaged and partially destroyed in the 1935 Labor Day hurricane. The Florida East Coast Railway was financially unable to rebuild the destroyed sections, so the roadbed and remaining bridges were sold to the state of Florida for $640,000.

Since the 1950s, the Overseas Highway has been refurbished into a main coastal highway between the cities of Miami and Key West, offering travelers an exotic roadway through a tropical savanna environment and access to the largest area of coral reefs on the U.S. mainland. Many exotic animals such as the American Alligator, American Crocodile and Key Deer inhabit the tropical islands of the Florida Keys.

History

While the Overseas Highway today runs along the former Overseas Railroad right of way, portions of the highway came into existence earlier in a different alignment while the railroad was still operational.  The concept of an Overseas Highway began with the Miami Motor Club in 1921.  The Florida land boom of the 1920s was underway and the club wanted to attract tourists to easily reached fishing areas, which could only be reached by boat or train at the time.  The land boom also attracted real estate interests who sought vehicular access to the upper keys where there were thousands of acres of undeveloped land.  The completion of the railroad further proved a highway through the keys was feasible.

Construction on the original Overseas Highway, designated State Road 4A (an extension of a route running from Miami to Homestead), lasted through most of the mid 1920s.  Officially opening for traffic on January 25, 1928, the original highway existed in two segments at its greatest extent.  One segment ran from the mainland via Card Sound Road to Key Largo and extended as far as Lower Matecumbe Key, while a segment in the lower keys existed from No Name Key to Key West.  An automobile ferry service connected the 41-mile gap between Lower Matecumbe and No Name Keys.  State Road 4A mostly ran alongside of the Overseas Railroad in the upper keys but in the lower keys, it followed a much different path than the railroad and current highway.  The ferry landing on No Name Key was located at the end of what is now Watson Boulevard, which carried State Road 4A across No Name Key and Big Pine Key before it crossed to Little Torch Key.  On Little Torch Key, it turned south and rejoined the railroad.  It would continue along the north side of the railroad to Upper Sugarloaf Key, where it turned south and ran along the current route of County Roads 939 and 939A over Lower Sugarloaf Key and the Saddlebunch Keys.  From the Saddlebunch Keys, State Road 4A crossed onto Geiger Key, continuing along what is now Geiger Road and Boca Chica Road.  On Boca Chica Key, it followed the shoreline south of Naval Air Station Key West's airstrip to Boca Chica Beach before crossing to Stock Island.  On Stock Island, it followed Maloney Avenue and MacDonald Avenue where it rejoined the Overseas Railroad heading into Key West.  Most of the State Road 4A bridges in the Lower Keys were of wooden construction and had been in use by the early 1920s.

By the early 1930s it was clear that the ferries were insufficient for the travel needs of the keys, and Monroe County and the State Road Department began making plans to connect the two portions of State Road 4A to make a continuous highway.  By 1931, the ferries would also service a 13-mile road built through Marathon on the Vaca Keys with terminals at Hog and Grassy Keys.  In 1933, the state legislature created the Overseas Road and Toll Bridge District to seek federal funding to extend the roadways.  Funding was scarce as the country was in the midst of the Great Depression, but funding would eventually come through the Federal Emergency Relief Administration, part of President Franklin D. Roosevelt's New Deal.  Hundreds of disgruntled World War I veterans seeking early payment of wartime pensions were employed for construction on the roadway and bridges as part of a government relief program.

Construction on a bridge connecting Lower Matecumbe Key and Long Key was already underway when the Category 5 Labor Day Hurricane struck Islamorada on September 2, 1935.  The hurricane caused widespread damage throughout the area and destroyed much of the Overseas Railroad in the upper keys.  Of the over 400 fatalities from the hurricane, more than half were veterans and their families.  Their deaths caused anger and charges of mismanagement that led to a Congressional investigation. Just west of Lower Matecumbe Key at Mile Marker 73 on the current highway, eight concrete bridge piers and a small dredged island are all that remains of the veterans' work.  The dredged island is now known as Veteran's Key and the piers remain as a tribute to the veterans with a memorial plaque on Craig Key.

After the hurricane, the Florida East Coast Railway was financially unable to rebuild the damaged sections of the Overseas Railroad.  Seizing a rare opportunity, the state purchased the railroad's entire right of way and remaining infrastructure for a price of $640,000.  The Overseas Road and Toll Bridge District abandoned its original highway plans and made new plans to build the highway on the old rail bed from Lower Matecumbe Key to Little Torch Key, effectively connecting the two segments of State Road 4A.  The railroad's bridges, which withstood the hurricane and were in good condition, were retrofitted with new two-lane wide concrete surfaces for automobile use.  In the case of the Bahia Honda Rail Bridge, which was a truss bridge, the concrete road surface was built on top of the trusses. The conversion of the railroad bridges to automobile use was accomplished by Cleary Brothers Construction Co. of West Palm Beach, and the entire route to Key West was opened to the public in 1938.

Portions of the road were tolled until April 15, 1954; toll booths were located on Big Pine Key and Lower Matecumbe Key. Pigeon Key, roughly the midway point of the Seven Mile Bridge, served as the headquarters for the "Overseas Road and Toll District." The toll for automobiles was $1, plus 25 cents per passenger.  The full highway from the mainland to Key West was officially opened for traffic on March 29, 1938 and upon completion, the route became the southernmost segment of U.S. Route 1, which previously terminated in Miami (State Road 4A would remain as a hidden designation until the 1945 Florida State Road renumbering, when the hidden designation became State Road 5).  President Franklin D. Roosevelt toured the road in 1939.

At this time, the Overseas Highway only ran along the old railroad route in the middle keys; the original highway segments were still in use in the upper and lower keys.  As the United States entered into World War II, the U.S. Navy sought improvements to the highway to improve their access from the Naval Air Station on Boca Chica Key to the mainland for national security purposes.  The 1920s-era lower keys segment was less than ideal with its winding road and rickety wooden bridges.  This resulted in completing the rest of the highway throughout the keys on the former railroad right of way, which the state already owned and was a more direct route with smoother curves that would allow for higher speeds.  Also included in this project was the construction of the highway from Florida City to Key Largo on the old railroad route via Jewfish Creek, which shortened the route from Key Largo to the mainland by 17 miles.  The new alignments were officially completed on May 16, 1944, with Florida Governor Spessard Holland presiding over ribbon-cutting ceremonies. The original Card Sound Bridge was closed after the Jewfish Creek alignment opened, and its remains were subsequently destroyed by a fire (the Card Sound route would be restored as a secondary route in 1969 with the opening of the current bridge).  Today, some segments of the original highway remain as side and frontage roads for the current highway.

The original highway through Key Largo and Tavernier would once again become part of the Overseas Highway in the early 1970s when it was expanded to a four-lane divided highway.  Here, the northbound lanes run along the route of the original highway and the southbound lanes along the route of the railroad, which is especially evident in area where the route splits into two one-way streets.  The widening was the beginning of a much larger project to rebuild much of the Overseas Highway, which included replacing the aging repurposed railroad bridges with more modern bridges; some of which are able to accommodate more than two lanes of traffic. This included the Seven Mile Bridge, the Bahia Honda Bridge and the Long Key Bridge (although these three original bridges are no longer open to vehicular traffic, they became listed on the National Register of Historic Places in 1979 and are currently used for fishing and pedestrian traffic). The more modern bridges were completed in the early 1980s.

In recent years, Pigeon Key was used by the University of Miami as an oceanography laboratory, but current efforts to restore the buildings on the island have resulted in the establishment of a railroad museum there.

Mile markers
The Florida Department of Transportation ("FDOT") maintains mile marker signs in the Florida Keys portion of Monroe County along the Overseas Highway (U.S. Highway No. 1). Numbering commences at "0" in Key West, and increases towards the east until Islamorada where the direction changes to the northeast following the Overseas Highway to Key Largo at "106." Outside of the city of Key West and the city of Marathon, street addresses  along the Overseas Highway in the Keys correspond to the mile markers. For example, the Tropical Research Laboratory of Mote Marine Laboratory has a physical address of 24244 Overseas Highway.  The first two digits indicate that the Laboratory is located at Mile Marker 24 (corresponding to an address on Summerland Key).  The next two digits indicate that it is about a quarter of a mile east of the Mile Marker 24 sign (MM 24.24), while the last digit, because it is an even number, indicates that it is located on the gulf side of the Overseas Highway (the term "gulf side" is used in the Middle and Lower Keys as the Overseas Highway runs east-west there; the term "bayside" is used in the Upper Keys where the Overseas Highway runs north-south.  All of the Keys use the term "oceanside").

The first two-to-three digits denote the Mile Marker, while the next digit denotes the nearest tenth of a mile (e.g., MM 102.5).
An address ending in an odd number indicates the location is on the Atlantic or oceanside of the Overseas Highway, while an address ending in an even number indicates the location is on the Florida Bay/Gulf of Mexico or bayside of the Overseas Highway.

Exceptions to this rule do exist, however.  There are occasional addresses ending in even numbers on the oceanside and vice versa.

Trail
In 2001, the Monroe County Commission, the Florida Department of Environmental Protection's Office of Greenways and Trails, and FDOT entered into a Memorandum of understanding to create the Florida Keys Overseas Heritage Trail (FKOHT). The trail will be a multi-use bicycle and pedestrian facility that will traverse the Florida Keys from Key Largo to Key West. Upon completion, the FKOHT will include an integrated system of educational kiosks, roadside picnic areas, scenic overlooks, fishing piers, water access points, and bicycle and jogging paths. The development of the trail will provide a mechanism for the preservation and use of the historic Flagler Railroad Bridges, 23 of which still exist and are mostly intact. In all cases, original bridgework will be repaired or rebuilt, and the breaks created during the 1980s and 1990s fishing pier conversion will be reconnected. Where the original roadway no longer exists, the trail will be temporarily cantilevered on the side of the current US 1 highway bridge, until new  trail bridge sections can be built. The new sections will be built to match the historical character of the original bridges.

In popular culture
One of animated television's Wacky Races was The Overseas Hi-Way Race, which first aired on December 28, 1968, on CBS, covering the entire actual route from Key Largo to Key West. While Long Key was correctly portrayed, most of the other in-between keys were given fictional names, and Sombrero Key was actually five miles south of the highway in open water, according to the Florida Keys–East map.

The Overseas Highway is depicted in a screenprint by American artist Ralston Crawford.

An action scene involving a car and fighter jet was filmed on a portion of the old Seven Mile Bridge for the 1994 James Cameron film True Lies. No part of the bridge was destroyed during filming; an 80-foot model of the bridge built off Sugarloaf Key was blown up instead.

Major intersections

References

External links

All-American Roads
Roads in Key West, Florida
Roads in Monroe County, Florida
Florida Scenic Highways
Florida East Coast Railway
Historic trails and roads in Florida
Florida Keys
History of Key West, Florida
U.S. Route 1
Former railway bridges in the United States
Former road bridges in the United States
Road bridges in Florida
Historic American Engineering Record in Florida
Bridges of the United States Numbered Highway System
Former toll roads in Florida
1938 establishments in Florida